The Winnipegosis komatiite belt is a  long and  wide greenstone belt located in the Lake Winnipegosis area of central Manitoba, Canada. It has no surface exposure and was identified based on geophysical signatures and drilling during mineral exploration by Cominco during the 1990s. The belt has an age of 1870 ± 7 million years and is predominantly composed of basaltic and komatiitic volcanic rocks with minor intrusive and sedimentary rocks. The belt is considered part of the larger Circum-Superior Belt and was likely generated by a mantle plume. The Winnipegosis Komatiite Belt is notable as one of the few examples of komatiite formed during the Proterozoic.

Geological setting 
The Winnipegosis Komatiite Belt is in the Superior Boundary Zone, in Manitoba, Canada, adjacent to the Thompson Nickel Belt. The Superior Boundary Zone lies along the northwestern margin of the Archaean Superior Craton, and forms the eastern foreland of the ~1.8-billion-year-old Trans-Hudson Orogen. The Trans-Hudson Orogen was a continental collision that formed following the closure of the ancient Manikewan Ocean.  It resulted in the juxtaposition of the Superior Craton with the amalgamated Rae and Hearne Cratons, and a number of continental fragments, including the Sask Craton. Closure of the Manikewan Ocean is believed to have begun by 1915 million years ago, though the first evidence of this ocean closure along the western Superior margin is the initiation of magmatism in the 1890-million-year-old Snow Lake Arc, interpreted as a subduction zone that formed outboard (towards the ocean) from the Superior Boundary Zone.  Mafic to ultramafic magmatism in the Winnipegosis Komatiite Belt is contemporaneous with ongoing magmatism in the Snow Lake Arc, which implies the Winnipegosis Komatiite Belt formed along a convergent plate boundary. The Winnipegosis Komatiite Belt forms part of the ~3000 km Circum-Superior Belt, considered a mantle-plume-derived large igneous province.

The Winnipegosis Komatiite Belt itself predominantly consists of tholeiitic basalt and komatiite, intercalated with lesser amounts of shale and dolomitic sediments, and intruded by mafic and ultramafic cumulates. These overlie a thin interval of conglomerate and sandstone, which lies unconformably on Superior Craton tonalites dated to 2792 million years old. The entire belt underwent sub–greenschist to greenschist facies metamorphism, during the Trans-Hudson Orogeny.

Winnipegosis Komatiites

Flow styles and petrography 

The Winnipegosis Komatiites are found as a number of stacked lava flows in boreholes drilled into the Winnipegosis Komatiite Belt. Two main flow types are found: massive and differentiated flows.  The massive flows have largely consistent compositions, mineral assemblages, and textures throughout. Olivine and chromite are the only phenocryst minerals and are evenly distributed within each flow. Groundmass phases include dendritic clinopyroxene, serpentinised dendritic olivine, and devitrified glass. Dendritic clinopyroxenes have spectacular textures including 'feathery' and 'swallowtail' varieties. The differentiated flows are separated into a cumulate layer at the base, and a spinifex layer at the top of each flow. The cumulate layers form by downwards sinking of olivine and chromite crystals through the lava, and have a thick layer of equant cumulate olivine overlain by a thin layer of large, skeletal 'hopper' olivine crystals. The spinifex layers form by growth of skeletal crystals from the top of the flow, and contain a range of textures and mineral assemblages, including random olivine spinifex and acicular clinopyroxene layers.

See also
Volcanism of Canada
Volcanism of Western Canada

References

Volcanism of Manitoba
Greenstone belts
Paleoproterozoic volcanism